O-Gon Kwon (born 2 September 1953) is a noted international South Korean judge, best known for being one of the three judges in the trial of Slobodan Milošević. He also sat on the bench for the trial of former Bosnian Serb leader Radovan Karadžić.

Early life and education
Kwon holds an LL.B. (1976) and an LL.M. (1983) from Seoul National University. He took his Bar Apprenticeship in the Judicial Research and Training Institute at the Supreme Court of Korea (1979). Judge Kwon also holds an LL.M. (1985) from Harvard Law School. He received a "Moran" National Order of Merit from the President of South Korea in September 2008.

Career
A judge at the Seoul District Court in 1979 and 1980, Kwon became Assistant Legal Advisor to President Chun Doo-hwan of Korea, a position he held until 1984. Between 1986 and 1990, he was a judge at the Seoul Criminal District Court and Judge at the Daegu High Court. From 1990 to 1992, Judge Kwon was Planning Director at the Ministry of Court Administration. From 1992 to 1993, he was a Research Judge at the Supreme Court of Korea. Between 1993 and 1999, he served as a Presiding Judge, successively in the Changwon, Suwon, and Seoul District Courts. In the meantime, he also served as Director of Research at the Constitutional Court of Korea from 1997 to 1999. He was a Presiding Judge at the Daegu High Court when elected as a Judge of the ICTY by the UN General Assembly.

At the ICTY, Kwon served on the bench which heard the trial of Slobodan Milošević, and has also been involved in several pre-trial proceedings, contempt trials and sentencing judgments. Currently a member of Trial Chamber II, Judge Kwon sits on the bench hearing the case of Prosecutor v. Popović et al. He is also a member of the Referral Bench, which determines whether certain cases pending before the Tribunal are suitable to be referred for trial in national courts. In addition, he is a member of the Tribunal's Rules Committee, which is charged with proposing additions and modifications to the Rules of Procedure and Evidence. In addition to his work at the ICTY, Judge Kwon has served as a member of the Board of Editors of the Journal of International Criminal Justice (Oxford) since 2007.

He is a member of the Crimes Against Humanity Initiative Advisory Council, a project of the Whitney R. Harris World Law Institute at  Washington University School of Law in St. Louis to establish the world’s first treaty on the prevention and punishment of crimes against humanity.

Judge and Vice-President
The International Criminal Tribunal for the former Yugoslavia (ICTY) is an entity which is chartered as a court of law by the United Nations to investigate and prosecute war crimes, which occurred throughout the Balkans in the 1990s. The Tribunal adjudicated conflict atrocities such as ethnic cleansing, war crimes, genocide, and crimes against humanity. In 2001, O-Gon Kwon was sworn in as Judge of the Tribunal on 17 November. As one of the Tribunal's judges his responsibilities included determining the guilt or innocence of those accused of perpetrating war crimes during the Balkan conflict, and he was tasked with passing sentence on the convicted.

By virtue of a mandate (elected by his peers), he became Vice President of the International Criminal Tribunal for the former Yugoslavia in November 2008.

Kwon was re-elected to a new two-year term as Vice President in November 2009.

In 2011, Kwon was elected by the Coalition for the International Criminal Court (CICC) as one of the five members in the Independent Panel on International Criminal Court Judicial Elections.

Prosecutor v. Popović et al
Judge Kwon heard the case of Prosecutor v. Popović et al. The ICTY judges agreed to join the nine defendant's trials linked to the Srebrenica massacre, who were all senior Bosnian Serb army, VRS, and police officers. Vujadin Popović - indicted for genocide, conspiracy to commit genocide, extermination, murder, persecutions, forcible transfer, deportation. Others under concurrent indictment in this case with the same or similar charges are Ljubiša Beara, Ljubomir Borovcanin, Milan Gvero, Radivoje Miletic, Drago Nikolić, Vinko Pandurević, Zdravko Tolimir and Milorad Trbić.

Presiding Judge for the Trial Against Radovan Karadžić
Judge Kwon served as the Presiding Judge for the case of former Bosnian Serb leader, Radovan Karadžić, and handed him a 40 year sentence on 24 March 2016.

Jurist history
 1979–1980  Seoul District Court judge
 1979–1984  Assistant Legal Advisor to the President of the Republic of Korea
 1986–1990  Seoul Criminal District Court Judge and Judge at the Daegu High Court
 1992–1993  Research Judge at the Supreme Court of Korea
 1993–1999  Presiding Judge Seoul District Courts
 1997–1999  Director of Research at the Constitutional Court of Korea
 2001   Presiding Judge at the Daegu High Court when elected as a Judge of the ICTY by the UN General Assembly.
 ICTY - Judge Kwon served on the bench which heard the trial of Slobodan Milošević

Qualifications 
 LL.B. (1976) Seoul National University Faculty of Law, Valedictorian 
 LL.M. (1983) Seoul National University Graduate School of Law
 Passed the Korean Bar with the highest score (1977)
 Took Bar Apprenticeship in the Judicial Research and Training Institute at the Supreme Court of Korea (1979).
 LL.M. (1985) Harvard Law School
 Kwon, O-Gon, The Challenge of an International Criminal Trial as Seen from the Bench (May 2007).  Journal of International Criminal Justice, Vol. 5, Issue 2, pp. 360–376, 2007

Awards 
 2008: "Moran" National Order of Merit from the President of the Republic of Korea.
 2018: Kyung-Ahm Prize, Kyung-Ahm Education & Cultural Foundation

References

External links
 The International Criminal Tribunal for the former Yugoslavia (ICTY)

1953 births
International Criminal Tribunal for the former Yugoslavia judges
Living people
South Korean judges
Harvard Law School alumni
Seoul National University School of Law alumni
South Korean judges of United Nations courts and tribunals